Top Country Albums is a chart that ranks the top-performing country music albums in the United States, published by Billboard.  In 1977, 12 different albums topped the chart, which was at the time published under the title Top Country LP's, based on sales reports submitted by a representative sample of stores nationwide.

In the issue of Billboard dated January 1, Waylon Jennings was at number one with his album Are You Ready for the Country, its tenth week in the top spot.  The following week it was displaced by Conway Twitty's album Conway Twitty's Greatest Hits Vol. II, but one week later Jennings was back at number one with Waylon Live, an album of live performances recorded in 1974, which spent six weeks atop the chart.  In June Jennings topped the chart once again with Ol' Waylon, which featured his most successful single, "Luckenbach, Texas (Back to the Basics of Love)".  Having entered the country albums chart regularly for nearly ten years without ever reaching number one, Jennings had now achieved four chart-topping albums in less than two years.  Ol' Waylon spent 13 consecutive weeks in the top spot, the longest unbroken run at number one since 1972, and meant that Jennings had the highest total number of weeks at number one during the year.

Two artists other than Jennings achieved more than one chart-topper during the year.  Dolly Parton spent a single week at number one in May with New Harvest...First Gathering, and returned to the top spot in December with Here You Come Again, which was the year's final number one.  The other artist with multiple chart-topping albums was Elvis Presley, who died on August 16.  In the issue of Billboard dated September 3, Moody Blue, the last album released in his lifetime, reached the top spot on the Top Country LP's chart and began a run of 10 consecutive weeks atop the listing.  When it was displaced from the top spot in the issue dated November 12, it was by another of Presley's recordings, Elvis in Concert, the soundtrack to a television special recorded in June 1977 and broadcast two months after his death.  The album reached number one in only its third week on the country chart, and spent five weeks at number one, giving Presley an unbroken run of 15 weeks in the top spot.  The singer, known as the "King of Rock and Roll", would make many more posthumous appearances in the country albums chart, but his next number one would not come until 2002.  In May Kenny Rogers topped the chart for the first time with his eponymous second solo album.  Over the next decade, Rogers would go on to experience huge success not only in country music but also in the pop music field, with number ones in both markets.  He is regarded as one of the most successful country singers of his generation.

Chart history

References

1977-related lists
1977
1977 record charts